Samen (also Romanized as Sāmen and Sāman) is a city in Hamadan Province, Iran and the capital of Samen District, in Malayer County. At the 2006 census, its population was 4,025, in 1,207 families.

The local language in Samen is Persian.

References

Populated places in Malayer County

Cities in Hamadan Province